The simple station Parque is a part of the TransMilenio mass-transit system of Bogotá, Colombia, opened in the year 2000.

Location

The station is located in southern Bogotá, facing the Parque El Tunal, from which it gets its name. Specifically, it is located on Avenida Ciudad de Villavicencio with Calle 55 Sur.

History

In 2002, a few months after the opening of the Portal del Norte, the Avenida Ciudad de Villavicencio line was opened, including this station.

Station services

Old trunk services

Current Trunk Services

Feeder routes

This station does not have connections to feeder routes.

Inter-city service

This station does not have inter-city service.

External links
TransMilenio

See also
Bogotá
TransMilenio
List of TransMilenio Stations

TransMilenio